"Your Little Secret" is the first single and title track from American singer-songwriter Melissa Etheridge's fifth studio album of the same name (1995). The song was released to US radio stations on October 9, 1995.

Production
The song was written by Melissa Etheridge. "Your Little Secret" (as well as the album) was produced by British record producer Hugh Padgham, who had also produced Etheridge's breakthrough 1993 album, Yes I Am. After the pop music success of singles from Yes I Am, "Your Little Secret" was marketed as a single for the alternative and modern rock music genres.

The single was released to US radio stations on October 9, 1995, with an emphasis on alternative and modern rock format stations.

Critical reception
Steve Baltin from Cash Box picked the song as Pick of the Week, noting that "this fiery rocker with the blues base has been immediately embraced at all formats of radio, successfully continuing the singles success she had with her breakthrough album, last year’s Yes I Am." He added, "Featuring the singer/songwriter’s infamous snarl on the song’s seductive chonis, “Your Little Secret” encapsulates all of the traits that have catapulted Etheridge into the best-bet category among pop/rock acts. And with VH1 all over this track, and two upcoming specials on the channel, expect this album to break out big."

Music video
The accompanying music video for "Your Little Secret" was directed by David Hogan, who had previously directed the video for "I'm the Only One".

The black and white video features Etheridge performing with her band against a white background. Etheridge, as well as the video's dancers, are seen through a keyhole, a recurring theme for the Your Little Secret album. In addition to the music video, the keyhole imagery was also utilized on the CD single cover art, the album cover, and the marketing campaign for the album.

The video depicts a woman, as well as other men and women, scaling and climbing a human wall of attractive male and female models. Etheridge and Hogan had become personal and professional friends. Hogan conceived the concept of a wall after listening to "You Little Secret" on repeat. In a 2015 interview, Hogan explained, "We [he and Etheridge] had met at a party through mutual friends and did our first video. We've remained friends ever since. She just called me about that one and I sat and listened to the song ["Your Little Secret"] over and over, as usual. It just kind of popped into my head. "Little secrets, I've got a whole wall of little secrets." So that's kind of where it came from." Two women kiss on screen, while other men and women get intimately close with each other. According to Steve Reeds, the then Vice President of video and alternative radio, the music video's themes were positively received by MTV and VH1.

The music video received a VH1 Fashion Awards nomination in 1996 for "Most Stylish Video."

Track listings

 Canadian and Australian CD single
 "Your Little Secret" – 4:20
 "All American Girl" (live) – 4:29
 "Chrome Plated Heart" (live) – 3:33
 "Keep It Precious" (live) – 8:56

 European CD single
 "Your Little Secret" – 4:20
 "All American Girl" (live) – 4:37

 UK CD single
 "Your Little Secret" – 4:20
 "All American Girl" (live) – 4:29
 "Bring Me Some Water" (live) – 4:18
 "Skin Deep" (live) – 3:45

Charts

Weekly charts

Year-end charts

Release history

References

1995 singles
1995 songs
Island Records singles
Melissa Etheridge songs
Music videos directed by David Hogan
Song recordings produced by Hugh Padgham
Songs written by Melissa Etheridge